A phoenix company is a successful commercial entity which has emerged from the collapse of another through insolvency. Unlike "bottom of the harbour" and similar schemes that strictly focus on asset stripping, the new company is set up as a legal successor, to trade in the same or similar trading activities as the former, and is able to present the appearance of "business as usual" to its customers. It has been described as "one that arises amidst or from the disarray and demise of its predecessor." A phoenix company may be classified either "innocent"/"bona fide" or abusive.

Nature of phoenix activity

Types of phoenix company operators
A study by the Australian Securities and Investments Commission has identified three groups of operators that practice phoenix activity:

Such activity can also be characterized as either "basic" (involving replacement of one entity by another) or "sophisticated" (which has regard for the intricacies of corporate groups, where management and directors may misuse the concept of the corporate veil).

Certain sectors see more frequent phoenix activity than others. In the events industry, public relations and marketing agencies are known to "phoenix" regularly.

Phoenix scenarios
Phoenix activity is generally observed to occur through the following scenarios:

Indicators of abuse
The primary identifiers of abusive phoenix activity have been described as "a deliberate and often cyclical misuse of the corporate form accompanied by a fraudulent scheme to evade creditors". Several common characteristics have been identified as indicating harmful phoenix activity:

the failed entity is formed with only a nominal share capital
the failed entity is under-capitalized
the directors/managers/controllers of the failed and successor company are the same
the failed entity is trading whilst insolvent
assets of the failed company are depleted shortly before the cessation of business
the failed company makes preferential payments to key creditors to assure supply to the successor company
the failed entity was operated to evade prior liabilities
the successor company operates in the same industry
the successor company trades with the same or similar name
the successor company commences trading immediately prior to, or within 12 months of, the cessation of the failed entity
assets of the failed company are transferred at below market value to the successor company
many of the employees of the failed company are re-employed by the successor company

United Kingdom
Company law in the UK has been formed to enable such activity in order to protect and promote entrepreneurship, by reducing risk and improving the chances of continued trading and business development. The National Fraud Authority has observed that:

Other less scrupulous directors may undertake such activity in order to evade liabilities to workers that accrue from continuous employment, such as the right to claim for unfair dismissal, or to receive statutory redundancy payments. The Employment Appeal Tribunal has held that such moves are generally barred under s. 218 of the Employment Rights Act 1996.

The law allows the directors of a failed company to be reinstated in the same, or similar posts in the phoenix company, within limits. The Company Directors Disqualification Act 1986 prohibits directors whose conduct led to the insolvency of a company from taking on similar roles elsewhere for a prescribed length of time. S. 216 of the Insolvency Act 1986 provides for both criminal and civil liability where directors or shadow directors of a company that has entered into liquidation become a director, or otherwise involved in the formation or management of another company that operates under the same or a similar name to the insolvent one, within the following twelve months of such liquidation. Remedies include petitioning the High Court to wind up a company, as in the 2014 case of Pinecom Services Limited and Pine Commodities Ltd (which had continued a business previously shut down in the public interest).

Criticism
There has been criticism in both the media and in Parliamentary quarters, as to the adverse effect on small to medium-sized suppliers to a failed company, whose position as creditors leaves them having to write off bad debt from the former company, with the phoenix company having shed all liability to cover the debt. Moreover, the House of Commons' Business and Enterprise Select Committee also raised concerns that the law may "adversely affect competitors, who will continue to carry costs which the phoenix company has shed."

Australia
Phoenix activity was identified in government reports as early as 1994, and the 2003 Final Report of the Royal Commission into the Building and Construction Industry devoted a chapter to its practice in that sector of the economy.

It has attracted the attention of the Australian Securities & Investments Commission, the Australian Taxation Office and the Fair Work Ombudsman, who have been pursuing those undertaking such practices to evade liability under their respective statutes. The Treasurer of Australia issued proposals in 2009 on options to deal with fraudulent phoenix activity, and the Parliament of Australia passed several Acts in 2012 as a result. An exposure draft was also issued for comment on the question of whether to assign joint and several liability to directors of phoenix companies in certain circumstances, but limited legislation directed at illegal phoenix activity was passed. In 2015 two significant government reports were released that included a consideration of how best to address phoenix activity: the Productivity Commission Report Business Set Up, Transfer and Closure, and the Senate Economic References Committee Report: I just want to be paid: Insolvency in the Australian Construction Industry. Despite the frequency and volume to attention given to phoenix activity by government and regulators, scholars note that "[t]here is no law in Australia that defines 'phoenix activity', nor declares it illegal"; "phoenix activity is an operational term, not a legal one".

The economic cost of phoenix activity has been estimated in 1996 by the Australian Securities Commission, and in 2012 by the Fair Work Ombudsman. While there is economic cost associated with all phoenix activity, the underlying behaviour is not always illegal and this makes estimating the economic costs associated with illegal phoenix activity extremely difficult.

Enforcement activity has been active under the Corporations Act:

 Several significant cases have dealt with the liability of directors conducting such activity.
 In ASIC v Somerville, the New South Wales Supreme Court, in a significant extension of liability, found that a legal advisor was not just complicit in certain directors’ breaches of duty, but was in fact instrumental in structuring new companies into which the assets of various insolvent companies were transferred. ASIC only sought disqualification for the advisor, but there has been debate as to whether it should have also sought compensation for creditors or a penalty in the circumstances.

The Fair Work Ombudsman has also investigated several high-profile cases:

 An abattoir business in New South Wales was pursued several times: initially for closing a business, terminating the staff, and setting up a new one while refusing to rehire ex-employees who were union members; and later for hiring workers through a separate subsidiary who worked for another connected company, and then draining the first company of funds after terminating several workers, before sending it into liquidation.
 A sole director of a transport company was fined for forcing a company into liquidation in order to avoid a claim by an employee for underpayment of wages.

See also
 General Motors, an example of a phoenix company (vis a vis Motors Liquidation Company, the "original" General Motors).

Further reading
  (2010) 8(2) eJournal of Tax Research 90
  (2012) 34(3) Sydney Law Review 411.
  (2014) 36(3) Sydney Law Review 471.
 
 Matthew, Anne F. (2015). "The Conundrum of Phoenix Activity: Is Further Reform Necessary?" Insolvency Law Journal 23: 116-135.
Sewell, Ben (2020). "The Complete Guide to Illegal Phoenix Activity" Sewell & Kettle Lawyers.
Phoenix Recovery (2020) "What is a Phoenix Company" phoenixcompany.co.uk

Notes

References

External links
 

Bankruptcy in the United Kingdom